Electric Mary is a rock and classic rock band from Melbourne, Australia. Their debut single "Sail On" reached #76 on the ARIA Singles chart.

Synopsis 
The band formed in 2003 and named themselves after Rusty Brown met Mary Campbell, the manager of Jimi Hendrix's Electric Lady Studios in New York City. In 2008 they were finalists at the MusicOz Awards, nominated for Best Rock Band. They were also selected to support Whitesnake and Judas Priest. 2009 saw them tour with Alice Cooper and Glenn Hughes, as well as showcasing at Experience PRS for PRS Guitars in Stevensville, Maryland alongside the likes of Carlos Santana, Dweezil Zappa and Buddy Guy. In 2010 they supported Deep Purple. Whilst in the States, Electric Mary collaborated with engineer/producer Jason Corsaro on a live recording.

The latter part of 2011 saw the band perform at the World Cup in South Africa and then embark on an extensive concert tour of mainland Europe including Hell Fest in France.

In 2012 the band returned to Europe for an extensive tour taking in France, Spain and Belgium and then over to the UK and then went on to perform at the Hard Rock Hell Festival in Wales. The same year, the band's drummer Stephen (Venom) Brown decided to leave and was replaced by Davey Porter, who Rusty had played with on and off for the previous 20 years.

In 2014 the band released the EP The Last Great Hope and embarked on a European tour, selling out shows in Spain and France. Upon returning home, Davey fell from a roof and broke his ankle, which kept the band off the road for more than a year.

In 2016 the band discovered the lost tapes of Hell Dorado from the previous tour, it was a revelation and they quickly snapped up the services of The Machine to mix the album. The band were hellbent on using The Machine after falling in love with his work on records by the band Clutch.

A tour of Europe in October 2016 started the Straight Out of Hell Dorado tour. At the end of the 2016 Straight Out of Hell Dorado tour, Davey decided to depart from the band and after extensive searching Paul (Spyda) Marrett was signed up for drumming duties.

In 2017 the band started writing for the next album and by the end of 2017 recording had begun. The album, Mother, was released in February 2019.

2021 sees the latest single released "The King Of Rock'n'Roll" the first Production of Rusty's company www.beinsidethecircle
2022 electric Mary released the single "3 Days Gone" produced by Alex Raunjak who also made the video clip https://m.youtube.com/watch?v=Ha437abv0qY

Discography

Albums

EPs
The Definition of Insanity (2006)
The Venom Principle (2008)
Long Time Coming (2011)
From the Vault (2012)
The Last Great Hope (2014)

Singles

References

External links

MySpace page
Facebook page

Victoria (Australia) musical groups
Australian rock music groups
Australian hard rock musical groups